Vraždy v kruhu is a Czech crime television series directed by Ivan Pokorný and starring Ivan Trojan, Richard Krajčo and Hana Vagnerová. It is based on the script by Ivy Procházková. . The specifics of the series is the connection of criminal stories with astrology. It consists of 12 episodes which form the skeleton of 12 different crimes committed from motives that are attributed to the 12 signs of the zodiac. Czech Television prepared it for its premiere broadcast on 5 January 2015, in the main Monday evening slot which is established for detective stories. The last episode aired on 23 March 2015.

The series was nominated for the Czech Lion in the category Best TV Series but didn't win.

Cast

Main
 Ivan Trojan as major Marián Holina
 Marek Němec as poručík Diviš Mrštík
 Richard Krajčo as kapitán Rosťa Bor
 Hana Vagnerová as Sábina Borová
 Simona Stašová as majorka Lída Šotolová
 Jiří Štrébl as podplukovník Zdeněk Karoch
 Adéla Petřeková as poručice Pavlína Fibichová
 Pavel Oubram as podporučík Jarda Svoboda
 Adéla Gondíková as Crazy reporter
 Martina Eliášová as MUDr. Hana Léblová
 Petr Panzenberger as Medical examiner assistant
 Petra Bučková as Mudr. Jitka Uhlířová
 Zdena Hadrbolcová as neighbor Štajfová

Production
Czech Television announced the filming of the series in the summer of 2013, specifically from June. It confirmed its planned inclusion in the program in March 2014, along with other series and programs. It should have been classified as a detective story of a classic socio-psychological nature, modeled after Scandinavian detective stories, and based mainly on the strong personality of the main character.

References

External links 
Official site

Czech crime television series
2015 Czech television series debuts
Czech Television original programming